The Solicitor General of Missouri is the top appellate lawyer for the State of Missouri. It is an appointed position in the Office of the Missouri Attorney General, with supervision over all of the office's  major appellate cases and amicus briefs. The majority of the matters that the Solicitor General handles are argued in the United States Supreme Court and the Missouri Supreme Court, although the Solicitor General is also responsible for Missouri's filings in the United States Court of Appeals for the Eighth Circuit and the Missouri Court of Appeals.

List of Solicitors General

References

 
Government of Missouri